Clone is the first studio album from Leo Kottke and Mike Gordon. It was released on October 8, 2002, and features the duo performing acoustic originals and cover songs on a variety of instruments.

History
The roots of the odd pairing of Kottke, an acoustic guitarist in the midst of a 30-year career, and Gordon, the bassist from the rock band Phish, began back in the late 1980s when Kottke performed live at the University of Vermont. Both Gordon and Phish guitarist Trey Anastasio - students at UVM - attended the concert. Years later, Gordon sent Kottke a cassette tape of his own rearranged version of Kottke's "The Driving of the Year Nail." The duo considered collaborating in the future, and finally began working together in the midst of Phish's two-and-a-half year hiatus.

Reception

Writing for Allmusic, music critic Tom Semioli wrote of the album "Phish bassist Mike Gordon and acoustic guitar virtuoso Leo Kottke are a natural multi-faceted collaboration... A timeless record by two artists on an organic journey. Take the ride."

Track listing
 "Arko" (Gordon, Kottke) – 1:23
 "Car Carrier Blues" (Gordon, Linitz) – 3:50
 "From Pizza Towers to Defeat" (Bob "Frizz" Fuller) – 3:08
 "Clone" (Gordon) – 4:51
 "The Collins Missile" (Gordon) – 4:01
 "Te Veo" (Kottke) – 2:33
 "Disco" (Kottke) – 3:10
 "June" (Gordon, Kottke) – 3:03
 "I Am a Lonesome Fugitive" (Liz Anderson, Casey Anderson) – 3:07
 "Clay" (Gordon, Linitz) – 3:03
 "Strange" (Kottke) – 1:12
 "Middle of the Road" (Kottke) – 2:55
 "Whip" (Gordon, Kottke) – 2:29
 "With" (Gordon, Linitz) – 2:46

Personnel
Leo Kottke - guitar, vocals, percussion
Mike Gordon - bass, vocals, guitar, percussion

References

External links
Mike Gordon's official site
Leo Kottke's official site
Unofficial Leo Kottke web site (fan site)

2002 albums
Mike Gordon albums
Leo Kottke albums
RCA Records albums